Protosiphon is a genus of green algae, specifically of the Chlorophyceae.

This is one of the few algae that doesn't go through fragmentation

References

External links

Scientific references

Scientific databases
 AlgaTerra database
 Index Nominum Genericorum

Chlamydomonadales genera
Chlamydomonadales